The Lake Line, as it is referred to by the SBB in English, is the Swiss railway line running from Rorschach via Romanshorn, Kreuzlingen, Steckborn and Stein am Rhein to Schaffhausen and forms the Swiss section of the ring railway around Lake Constance.

History 

On 15 October 1869 the section of line from Romanshorn to Rorschach was opened. Not quite two years later, on 1 July 1871, it was followed by the Romanshorn–Konstanz line. During its early years the railway belonged to the Swiss Northeastern Railway, the NOB, which was transferred in 1902 into the SBB.

In 1996, the line was taken over by Mittelthurgaubahn following a competition. They introduced half-hourly fixed-interval services and modernised both track and rolling stock. When Mittelthurgaubahn went bankrupt in 2003 the line went into the SBB subsidiary, Thurbo, which had been intended as a joint venture between the SBB and Mittelthurgaubahn.

References 

Railway lines in Switzerland
Railway lines in Baden-Württemberg
Cross-border railway lines in Germany
Cross-border railway lines in Switzerland
Railway lines opened in 1869